The Aldrich–Vreeland Act was a United States law passed in response to the Panic of 1907 which established the National Monetary Commission.

On May 27, 1908, the bill passed the House, mostly on a party-line vote of 166–140, with 13 Republicans voting against it and no Democrats voting for it. On May 30, it passed in the Senate with 43 Republicans for the act and five Republicans joining the 17 Democrats against it. President Roosevelt signed the bill that same night.

The act also allowed national banks to start national currency associations in groups of ten or more, with at least $5 million in total capital, to issue emergency currency. The bank notes were to be backed by not only government bonds but also almost any securities the banks were holding. The act proposed that the emergency currency had to go through a process of approval by the officers of the national currency associations before they were distributed by the Comptroller of the Currency.

However, it is possible that because there was a 5 percent tax placed on this emergency currency for the first month it was "outstanding" and a 1 percent increase for the following months it was "outstanding," no bank notes were issued. Another possible explanation that the emergency currency was never issued was that it was unnecessary.

Congress modified and extended the law in 1914 when British and other foreign creditors demanded immediate payments in gold in amounts that would ordinarily have been carried over and paid through exports of commodities.

Senator Nelson W. Aldrich (R-RI) was largely responsible for the Aldrich-Vreeland Currency Law and became the Chairman of the National Monetary commission. The co-sponsor of the legislation was Representative Edward Vreeland, a Republican from New York.

A usage of the law occurred at the outbreak of World War I in 1914 when the first great financial panic of the 20th century befell the world, necessitating the closure of the New York Stock Exchange. Secretary of the Treasury William Gibbs McAdoo appeared in New York City and assured the public that ample stocks of emergency banknotes had been prepared in accordance with the Aldrich–Vreeland Act and were available for issue to the banks.  As of October 23, 1914, $368,616,990 was outstanding.

The Federal Reserve Act of December 23, 1913 took effect in November 1914, when the 12 regional banks opened for business. Ultimately, the emergency currency issued under the Aldrich-Vreeland Law Act was entirely withdrawn.

References

Further reading
 Silber, William L. "The Great Financial Crisis of 1914: What Can We Learn from Aldrich-Vreeland Emergency Currency?." American economic review (2007): 285–289. online
 Laughlin, J. Laurence. "The Aldrich-Vreeland Act." Journal of Political Economy (1908) 16#8 pp: 489–513. in JSTOR
 West, Robert Craig. Banking reform and the Federal Reserve, 1863-1923 (Cornell University Press, 1977)
 Wicker, Elmus. The Great Debate on Banking Reform: Nelson Aldrich and the Origins of the Fed (Ohio State University Press, 2005)

External links
Federal Reserve History:  1908-1912:  The Stage is Set for Decentralized Central Bank

1908 in law
United States federal banking legislation
History of the Federal Reserve System
National Monetary Commission
1908 in the United States
60th United States Congress
Progressive Era in the United States